Sizzlin' is an album by saxophonist Arnett Cobb recorded in 1960 for the Prestige label.

Reception
The Allmusic review awarded the album 3 stars.

Track listing 
(All compositions by Arnett Cobb except as indicated)
 "Sweet Georgia Brown" (Ben Bernie, Kenneth Casey, Maceo Pinkard) - 5:06  
 "Black Velvet" (Illinois Jacquet) - 5:22  
 "Blue Sermon" - 7:43  
 "Georgia on My Mind" (Hoagy Carmichael, Stuart Gorrell) - 6:02  
 "Sizzlin'" - 7:34  
 "The Way You Look Tonight" (Dorothy Fields, Jerome Kern) - 6:55

Personnel 
 Arnett Cobb - tenor saxophone
 Red Garland - piano
 George Tucker - bass
 J. C. Heard - drums

References 

Arnett Cobb albums
1960 albums
Albums produced by Esmond Edwards
Albums recorded at Van Gelder Studio
Prestige Records albums